Dorothe Engelbretsdatter (16 January 163419 February 1716) was a Norwegian author. She principally wrote hymns and poems which were strongly religious.  She has been characterized as Norway's first recognized female author as well as Norway's first feminist before feminism became a recognized concept.

Background
Dorothe Engelbretsdatter was born in Bergen, Norway. She was the daughter of Rector and Vicar, Engelbret Jørgenssøn  (1592–1659)  and Anna Wrangel.  Her father was originally head of Bergen Cathedral School, and later dean of Bergen Cathedral. In her youth, Dorothe spent some time in Copenhagen.  In 1652, she married Ambrosius Hardenbeck (1621–1683),  a theological writer famous for his flowery funeral sermons, who succeeded her father at the Cathedral in 1659. They had five sons and four daughters.

Career

In 1678 her first volume appeared,  Siælens Sang-Offer  published at Copenhagen. This volume of hymns and devotional pieces, very modestly brought out, had an unparalleled success. The first verses of Dorothe Engelbretsdatter are commonly believed to have been her best.

The fortunate poet was invited to Denmark, and on her arrival at Copenhagen was presented at court. She was also introduced to Thomas Hansen Kingo, the father of Danish poetry. The two greeted one another with improvised couplets, which have been preserved and of which Engelbretsdatter's reply "is incomparably the neater".  King Christian V of Denmark granted her full tax freedom for life. Her Taare-Offer (1685) was dedicated to Queen Charlotte Amalia, the wife of King Christian V.

Her first work, Siælens Sang-Offer was published 1678.  In the midst of her troubles appeared her second work, the Taare-Offer, published for the first time in 1685.  It is a continuous religious poem in four books.  This was combined with  Siælens Sang-Offer.   In 1698 she brought out a third volume of sacred verse, Et kristeligt Valet fra Verden.

In 1683, her husband died.  She had nine children, but seven of them died young and her two adult sons lived far away from Bergen. She lost her house in the great fire in 1702 in which 90 percent of the city of Bergen was destroyed. Her re-placement house was not available until 1712. Her sorrow is evident in examples such as the poem Afften Psalme. She died on 19 February 1716.

Collected works 
Her collected works were published in two volumes (1955-1956)

 Volume 1 (1955)
 Volume 2 (1956)

New edition was released in 1999.

See also
 Petter Dass
 Cille Gad

References

Attribution

Bibliography
Engelbretsdotter, Dorothe;  ed. by K. Valkner  (1999)  Samlede skrifter (Oslo: Aschehoug) 
Akslen, Laila  (1998) Norsk barokk: Dorothe Engelbrettsdatter og Petter Dass i retorisk tradisjon (Oslo: Cappelen) 
Akslen, Laila (1970) Feminin barokk: Dorothe Engelbretsdotters liv og diktning (Oslo: Cappelen)

Further reading
Grindal, Gracia (2011) Preaching from Home: The Stories of Seven Lutheran Women Hymn Writers (Wm. B. Eerdmans Publishing)

External links 
 Dorothe Engelbretsdatter i Dagbladet Forfatter
 Dorothe Engelbretsdatter i NRK Forfatter
Dorothe Engelbretsdatter Digitalarkivet.no

1634 births
1713 deaths
Norwegian Lutheran hymnwriters
Women religious writers
Norwegian women poets
Writers from Bergen
17th-century Norwegian poets
17th-century Norwegian women writers
18th-century Norwegian poets
18th-century Norwegian women writers
18th-century Norwegian writers
Women hymnwriters